A political buzzword is a short excerpt from a speech or a brief public quote, intended to mark the spirits and be repeated in the media. 

This type of use of rhetoric has multiplied as a result of the development and democratization of the media. It brings visibility and a massive diffusion to the words of a public person. However, its format, including television, makes short and impactful statements are more likely to be aired and restated.

See also 

 Tear down this wall!
 Talking point

Buzzword